Ayakan Alphonse Yombi (born June 30, 1969) is a Cameroonian former footballer.
He was a member of the Cameroon squad at the 1990 World Cup in Italy.
As a professional, he played among others in his home at Canon Yaounde and Olympic Mvolyé, and in Europe at Vejle BK in Denmark and Iraklis Thessaloniki F.C. in Greece.

References

1969 births
Living people
Footballers from Yaoundé
Cameroonian footballers
Cameroonian expatriate footballers
Cameroon international footballers
Canon Yaoundé players
Olympic Mvolyé players
Vejle Boldklub players
Iraklis Thessaloniki F.C. players
Expatriate footballers in Greece
Expatriate footballers in France
Expatriate men's footballers in Denmark
1990 FIFA World Cup players
Association football defenders